Brzi Brod is a neighborhood situated in the Medijana municipality of the city of Niš, in Serbia. According to the 2011 census, it has a population of 4642.

References

Populated places in Nišava District